"The Tower" is a poem by the Irish poet William Butler Yeats. It is a passionate indictment of a man wrestling with age. It is the second poem in The Tower, a 1928 collection of Yeats's poems.

Below appears a small extract from the poem: 

What shall I do with this absurdity –
O heart, O troubled heart – this caricature,
Decrepit age that has been tied to me
As to a dog's tail?
Never had I more
Excited, passionate, fantastical
Imagination, nor an ear and eye
That more expected the impossible –
No, not in boyhood when with rod and fly,
Or the humbler worm, I climbed Ben Bulben's back
And had the livelong summer day to spend.
It seems that I must bid the Muse go pack,
Choose Plato and Plotinus for a friend
Until imagination, ear and eye,
Can be content with argument and deal
In abstract things; or be derided by
A sort of battered kettle at the heel.

William Butler Yeats

Poetry by W. B. Yeats